Park Su-gwon (born 28 January 1941) is a South Korean athlete. He competed in the men's javelin throw at the 1964 Summer Olympics.

References

1941 births
Living people
Athletes (track and field) at the 1964 Summer Olympics
South Korean male javelin throwers
Olympic athletes of South Korea
Place of birth missing (living people)
Asian Games medalists in athletics (track and field)
Asian Games silver medalists for South Korea
Athletes (track and field) at the 1970 Asian Games
Medalists at the 1970 Asian Games